Foliatus, a Latin word meaning leafy, may refer to:
 Foliatus Worm, a subclass of worms in the Kamen Rider series
 Holonothrus foliatus, Wallwork, 1963, a mite species in the genus Holonothrus and the family Crotoniidae found in Antarctica
 Paraamblyseius foliatus, Corpuz-Raros, 1994, a mite species in the genus Paraamblyseius and the family Phytoseiidae
 Tmarus foliatus, Lessert, 1928, a crab spider species in the genus Tmarus found in Africa and the Comoro Islands

See also
 Foliata (disambiguation)
 Foliatum (disambiguation)
 bifoliatus
 Culex bifoliatus Duret & Baretto, 1956, a species in the genus Culex found in Brazil
 infoliatus
 Culex infoliatus, Bonne-Wepster & Bonne, 1919, a species in the genus Culex found in Brazil, Ecuador, Peru, Suriname, Venezuela and French Guiana
 quadrifoliatus
 Culex quadrifoliatus, Komp, 1936, a species in the genus Culex found in Panama
 trifoliatus
 Culex trifoliatus, Edwards, 1914, a species in the genus Culex found in Ethiopia, Ghana, Kenya, Namibia, South Africa, Sudan, Uganda and Zaire